The Battle of Manila (Filipino: Labanan sa Maynila), the first and largest battle of the Philippine–American War, was fought on February 4–5, 1899, between 19,000 American soldiers and 15,000 Filipino armed militiamen. Armed conflict broke out when American troops, under orders to turn away insurgents from their encampment, fired upon an encroaching group of Filipinos. Philippine President Emilio Aguinaldo attempted to broker a ceasefire, but American General Elwell Stephen Otis rejected it, and fighting escalated the next day. It ended in an American victory, although minor skirmishes continued for several days afterward.

Disposition of forces

Filipino forces
After the surrender of Manila to American forces by the Spanish in 1898, General Aguinaldo demanded the occupation of a line of blockhouses on the Zapote Line, which had been the Spanish defensive perimeter. General Otis initially refused this but later said that he would not object unless overruled by higher authority. It was estimated at the time that about 20,000 Filipino troops were surrounding Manila, with their distribution and exact composition only partially known.

American forces
U.S. Army forces numbered some 800 officers and 20,000 enlisted men. Of these, the Army deployed some 8,000 in Manila and 11,000 in a defensive line inside the Zapote line. The remaining American troops were in Cavite or in transports off Iloilo.

First shots

Sources generally agree that the first shots were fired by Private William Walter Grayson (April 9, 1876, England - March 20, 1941, San Francisco, United States), an Englishman who had migrated to Nebraska with his parents c. 1890. Having worked as a hostler, he had enlisted as a volunteer soldier in Lincoln, Nebraska, in May 1898, a month after the Spanish–American War erupted, and had deployed with his unit to the Philippines in June 1898. Grayson's unit, the First Nebraska Volunteer Infantry under Colonel John M. Stotsenburg, had been encamped in Santa Mesa, Manila, since December 5, 1898. During their encampment, there had been incidents on and around the San Juan Bridge, located just to the east of their encampment area.

On the morning of February 4, Stotsenburg said, "Your orders are to hold the village. If any armed men come into our lines order them out. If they persist in coming, summon enough men to arrest them. In case an advance in force is made, fall back to the pipeline outpost and resist the occupation of the village by all means in your power, calling on these headquarters for assistance." In a report later that day, Lt. Burt D. Wheedon wrote, "On the morning of February 4 the insurgents ordered our men to move out of town (Santol), and upon their refusal to do so the former said that they would bring a body of men and drive them back when night came." Lt. Wheedon took charge of an outpost on Santol road at seven in the evening and, at 7:30, gave orders saying, "No armed insurgents to enter the town or vicinity ... Halt all armed persons who attempted to advance from the direction of the insurgents' lines which lie between blockhouses 6 and 7 and the San Juan Bridge and order them back to their lines. If they refused to go, arrest them if possible, or if this was impossible, fire upon them... Patrol each of the roads leading to Blockhouses 6 and 7 for 100 yards every half hour." (Blockhouse 6 was located on the city line just southeast of what is now Santol Street.

At about 8 pm on February 4, 1899, Grayson, along with Private Orville Miller and one other man, advanced from Santol towards Blockhouse 7, suddenly encountering four armed men after about five minutes of patrolling. According to Grayson's account, he and Miller called "Halt!" and, when the four men responded by cocking their rifles, they fired at them and retreated to Santol. Personal accounts by Grayson claim that he "dropped" two and Miller one, but neither American nor Filipino official reports mention anyone being hit. The skirmish is credited for beginning the Battle of Manila and the Philippine–American War.

Worcester writes that General Otis' account of the opening of active hostilities was as follows: 

Grayson later recounted the first shot:

This event began the Battle of Manila. On August 23, 1899 he was honorably discharged.

Other sources name the two specific U.S. soldiers involved in the first exchange of fire as Privates William Grayson and Orville Miller of the Nebraska Volunteers.

After the conclusion of the war, after analyzing captured insurgent papers, Major Major J. R. M. Taylor wrote, in part,

Some sources assert that the encounter took place on San Juan Bridge. A marker which had stood on that site was ordered moved to Santa Mesa in 2003 by Ambeth Ocampo, then chairman of the National Historical Commission of the Philippines, after research by Dr. Benito Legarda concluded that the shot was fired somewhere between Blockhouse 7 (within Manila's boundary) and Barrio Santol (Sampaloc District) on the connecting road that is now Sociego.

Reactions of Aguinaldo and Otis

Aguinaldo was away in Malolos when the conflict started on the 4th. That same night, a Filipino captain in Manila wired him in Malolos, stating that the Americans had started the hostilities. Aguinaldo wanted to avoid open conflict with the Americans while maintaining his leadership position with his nationalist followers. The next day (February 5), Aguinaldo sent an emissary to General Otis to mediate, saying, "the firing on our side the night before had been against my order."

Otis, who was then confident that a military campaign against Aguinaldo would be swift, was a veteran of the American Indian Wars and reacted much as he might have to his Sioux opponents decades before: "Fighting having begun, must go on to the grim end."

Aguinaldo then reassured his followers with a pledge to fight if forced by the Americans, whom he had come to fear as new oppressors come to replace the Spanish.

Battle
Caught off guard by the sudden outburst, the Filipinos remained in their trenches and exchanged fire with the Americans. A Filipino battalion mounted a charge against the 3rd U.S. Artillery, routed a company of American soldiers, and succeeded in capturing two artillery pieces for a little while. The Filipino troops had been caught unprepared and leaderless, as their generals had gone home to their families for the weekend. The American soldiers, in contrast, were ready and needed only to follow previously prepared planning. The next day, Brigadier General Arthur MacArthur ordered an American advance.

When Filipino officers did arrive on the field, many influential leaders tried to stop the fighting. Aguinaldo sent emissaries to negotiate a cease-fire. But Otis and MacArthur thought the crisis should be brought to a head and refused to negotiate.

General MacArthur, in command of the North of Manila, had developed a defensive plan which called for his entire division to launch an all-out offensive along the Santa Mesa Ridge in the event of an attack, capture the blockhouses, and seize the Chinese hospital and La Loma Cemetery. General Anderson, along the southern lines, believed he faced an imminent attack, so, with permission from Otis, he sent his entire division in a preemptive strike at first light. Brig. Gen. Pio del Pilar's forces fled into the Pasig River where many drowned. The battle of February 5 was fought along a 25 km (16-mile) front and was the biggest and bloodiest of the war. } It involved all or part of 13 American regiments and thousands of Filipinos. American casualties totaled 238, of whom 44 were killed in action or died from wounds. The U.S. Army's official report listed Filipino casualties as 4,000, of whom 700 were killed, but this is guesswork.

The Filipinos were shocked when the Americans attacked. They were used to Spanish tactics of retreating into fortified cities after a nighttime raid. MacArthur's attack in the north captured the ridge overlooking Manila. (MacArthur was later promoted to Major General and became Governor-General of the Philippines.) After initial confusion, Brigadier General Thomas M. Anderson's attack in the south captured the village of Pasay and Filipino supplies stored there.

The Filipinos were counting on an uprising by the citizens of Manila to divide American forces and interrupt American supply lines. Although some fires were set inside the city, no general uprising occurred since Provost Marshal Brig. Gen. Robert Patterson Hughes' Provost Guard quickly suppressed any disturbances.  However, some small units of Philippine soldiers who had not been part of the force that was routed skirmished with the Americans for several days on the outskirts of Manila before being driven out.

Order of battle

Filipino
Philippine Republican Army – General Emilio Aguinaldo
Chief-of-Operations: General Antonio Luna

U.S.
Eighth Army Corps – Major General Elwell S. Otis
Provost Marshal: Brigadier General Robert P. Hughes
Judge Advocate General: Lieutenant Colonel Enoch Crowder
Chief of Engineers: Major James Franklin Bell

Memorial
While it was previously thought that the shot had been fired on San Juan Bridge, in 1999 was found that it was fired on Silencio Street in Sta. Mesa, Manila. The marker was moved there from the bridge in 2003.

See also
Campaigns of the Philippine–American War

References

Bibliography

Further reading

 

Battle of Manila (1899)
Battle of Manila (1899)
Battles of the Philippine–American War
History of Manila
February 1899 events